Sir Gerald Bomford  (1851-1915) was a British surgeon who succeeded Benjamin Franklin as the Director General of the Indian Medical Service and held the post between 1905 and 1910, until being succeeded by Charles Pardey Lukis. His children included Sir Hugh Bomford and Guy Bomford.

He was created a Companion of the Order of the Indian Empire (CIE) in the 1903 Durbar Honours, and was later promoted to a Knight Commander of the order (KCIE).

References

1851 births
1915 deaths
People from the Isle of Wight
Alumni of King's College London
British surgeons
Indian Medical Service officers
Knights Commander of the Order of the Indian Empire
19th-century English medical doctors
20th-century English medical doctors
Fellows of the Royal College of Surgeons of Edinburgh
20th-century surgeons
British people in colonial India